The  opened in Makubetsu, Hokkaidō, Japan in 1988. It commemorates the chance discovery of a fossilized Naumann's elephant in Chūrui, now Makubetsu, on 26 July 1969, during construction work on a farm road: the youth who unearthed the initial piece with his pickaxe crying out . During the course of three subsequent excavations, some forty-seven bones were recovered, representing 70–80% of the total skeleton. Twenty-two museums in Japan and the rest of the world now house the reconstructed elephant's remains from the Chrui finds.

See also
 Lake Nojiri Naumann Elephant Museum
 Blind men examining an elephant

References

External links
 Chūrui Naumann Elephant Museum 
 Chūrui Naumann Elephant Museum 

Museums in Hokkaido
Natural history museums in Japan
Makubetsu, Hokkaido
1988 establishments in Japan
Museums established in 1988